Claude Santelli (17 June 1923 – 14 December 2001) was a French film director and screenwriter. He directed 25 films between 1968 and 1996.

Selected filmography
 Histoire vraie (1973)
 Madame Baptiste (1974)

References

External links

1923 births
2001 deaths
French film directors
French male screenwriters
20th-century French screenwriters
People from Metz
20th-century French male writers